is a Japanese ice hockey forward and member of the Japan women's national ice hockey team, currently playing with Toyota Cygnus of the Women's Japan Ice Hockey League (WJIHL) and the All-Japan Women's Ice Hockey Championship.

International career
Fujimoto was selected for the Japan women's national ice hockey team in the 2014 Winter Olympics. She played in all five games, not recording a point. She also played for Japan in the qualifying event.

Fujimoto also competed at the 2018 Winter Olympics.

As of 2015, Fujimoto has also appeared for Japan at two IIHF Women's World Championships, with the first in 2013.

Fujimoto made two appearances for the Japan women's national under-18 ice hockey team at the IIHF World Women's U18 Championships, with the first in 2009.

As a member of the Espoo Blues Naiset, she won the Finnish Championship in 2015 and a bronze medal at the 2015 IIHF European Women's Champions Cup.

Career statistics

International career
Through 2014–15 season

References

External links

1992 births
Living people
Japanese women's ice hockey forwards
People from Tomakomai, Hokkaido
Olympic ice hockey players of Japan
Ice hockey players at the 2014 Winter Olympics
Ice hockey players at the 2018 Winter Olympics
Espoo Blues Naiset players
Universiade medalists in ice hockey
Universiade bronze medalists for Japan
Competitors at the 2015 Winter Universiade
Asian Games medalists in ice hockey
Ice hockey players at the 2011 Asian Winter Games
Ice hockey players at the 2017 Asian Winter Games
Medalists at the 2011 Asian Winter Games
Medalists at the 2017 Asian Winter Games
Asian Games gold medalists for Japan
Asian Games silver medalists for Japan